In number theory, a self number or Devlali number in a given number base  is a natural number that cannot be written as the sum of any other natural number  and the individual digits of . 20 is a self number (in base 10), because no such combination can be found (all  give a result less than 20; all other  give a result greater than 20). 21 is not, because it can be written as 15 + 1 + 5 using n = 15. These numbers were first described in 1949 by the Indian mathematician D. R. Kaprekar.

Definition and properties
Let  be a natural number. We define the -self function for base   to be the following:

where  is the number of digits in the number in base , and 

is the value of each digit of the number.

In general, for even bases, all odd numbers below the base number are self numbers, since any number below such an odd number would have to also be a 1-digit number which when added to its digit would result in an even number. For odd bases, all odd numbers are self numbers.

The set of self numbers in a given  base  is infinite and has a positive asymptotic density: when  is odd, this density is 1/2.

Recurrent formula 

The following recurrence relation generates some base 10 self numbers:

(with C1 = 9)

And for binary numbers:

(where j stands for the number of digits) we can generalize a recurrence relation to generate self numbers in any base b:

in which C1 = b − 1 for even bases and C1 = b − 2 for odd bases.

The existence of these recurrence relations shows that for any base there are infinitely many self numbers.

Selfness tests

Reduction tests 

Luke Pebody showed (Oct 2006) that a link can be made between the self property of a large number n and a low-order portion of that number, adjusted for digit sums:

Effective test 

Kaprekar demonstrated that:

 is self if 

Where:

Self numbers in specific bases  
For base 2 self numbers, see . (written in base 10)

The first few base 10 self numbers are:
 1, 3, 5, 7, 9, 20, 31, 42, 53, 64, 75, 86, 97, 108, 110, 121, 132, 143, 154, 165, 176, 187, 198, 209, 211, 222, 233, 244, 255, 266, 277, 288, 299, 310, 312, 323, 334, 345, 356, 367, 378, 389, 400, 411, 413, 424, 435, 446, 457, 468, 479, 490, ... 

In base 12, the self numbers are: (using A and B for ten and eleven, respectively)
1, 3, 5, 7, 9, B, 20, 31, 42, 53, 64, 75, 86, 97, A8, B9, 102, 110, 121, 132, 143, 154, 165, 176, 187, 198, 1A9, 1BA, 20B, 211, 222, 233, 244, 255, 266, 277, 288, 299, 2AA, 2BB, 310, 312, 323, 334, 345, 356, 367, 378, 389, 39A, 3AB, 400, 411, 413, 424, 435, 446, 457, 468, 479, 48A, 49B, 4B0, 501, 512, 514, 525, 536, 547, 558, 569, 57A, 58B, 5A0, 5B1, ...

Self primes 

A self prime is a self number that is prime. 

The first few self primes in base 10 are
3, 5, 7, 31, 53, 97, 211, 233, 277, 367, 389, 457, 479, 547, 569, 613, 659, 727, 839, 883, 929, 1021, 1087, 1109, 1223, 1289, 1447, 1559, 1627, 1693, 1783, 1873, ... 

The first few self primes in base 12 are:
3, 5, 7, B, 31, 75, 255, 277, 2AA, 3BA, 435, 457, 58B, 5B1, ...

In October 2006 Luke Pebody demonstrated that the largest known Mersenne prime in base 10 that is at the same time a self number is 224036583−1. This is then the largest known self prime in base 10 .

Extension to negative integers
Self numbers can be extended to the negative integers by use of a signed-digit representation to represent each integer.

Excerpt from the table of bases where 2007 is self 

The following table was calculated in 2007.

References

 Kaprekar, D. R. The Mathematics of New Self-Numbers Devaiali  (1963): 19 - 20. 
 
 
 
 

Arithmetic dynamics
Base-dependent integer sequences
Inverse functions